After Henry may refer to:
After Henry (radio series), a BBC Radio 4 situation comedy by Simon Brett
After Henry (TV series), a Thames Television situation comedy, based on the radio series
After Henry (book), a book of essays by Joan Didion